The CAF Super Cup (also known as African Super Cup or for sponsorship reasons TotalEnergies CAF Super Cup) is an annual African association football competition contested between the winners of the CAF Champions League and the CAF Confederation Cup. The competition was first held in 1993 and is organized by the CAF.

Egyptian clubs have the highest number of victories (12 titles), followed by Morocco with 5. Morocco have the largest number of winning teams, with four clubs from each having won the title. The competition has been won by 16 clubs, 6 of which have won it more than once. Al Ahly is the most successful club in the competition's history, having won the tournament a record 8 times. RS Berkane are the current defending champions, having beaten Wydad AC by two goals to nil in the 2022 CAF Super Cup.

History
The idea of an African Supercup germinated and was introduced at the Fraternity Tournament in Abidjan. In 1982, JS Kabylie, winner of the African Cup of Champions Clubs in 1981, won this trophy by defeating the winner of the African Cup Winners' Cup, Union Douala, on penalties 4–3 after the score of 1–1. But this cup did not officially see the light of day until 1993 under the name of the CAF Super Cup.

It is played in a single match and on the field of the winner of the Champions League (exception in 2007). Until 2003, the African Supercup pitted the winner of the Champions League against the winner of the African Cup Winners' Cup. When the latter disappeared, it was the winner of the Confederation Cup who took the place.

On only five occasions, the winner of the C1 lost in this competition: the Ivorian club Africa Sports d'Abidjan beat the Moroccans Wydad AC in the first edition in Abidjan in 1993, the ES Sahel have beat Raja CA in 1997, Maghreb de Fès beat ES Tunis in 2012, Raja CA and Zamalek SC beat ES Tunis in 2019 and 2020.

Fez Maghreb is the first Confederation Cup winning club to have won the CAF Supercup since the CAF Champions League winner clashed with the Confederation Cup winner.

Venues

List of venues since 2015 
2015: Stade Mustapha Tchaker, Algeria
2016: Stade TP Mazembe, DR Congo
2017: Loftus Versfeld Stadium, South Africa
2018: Stade Mohammed V, Morocco
2019-2020: Thani bin Jassim Stadium, Qatar
2021 (May): Jassim bin Hamad Stadium, Qatar
2021 (Dec): Ahmed bin Ali Stadium, Qatar
2022: Prince Moulay Abdellah Stadium, Morocco

Sponsorship

In July 2016, Total secured an eight-year sponsorship package from the Confederation of African Football (CAF) to support 10 of its principal competitions. Total started with the Africa Cup of Nations that was held in Gabon therefore renaming it Total Africa cup of Nations. Due to this sponsorship, starting from 2017 the tournament is called the "Total CAF Super Cup".

Records and statistics

Winners

By country

Prize money
In 2017 and 2018, prize money shared between CAF Champions League winner and CAF Confederations Cup winner in CAF Super Cup were as following :

Since 2019, prize money in CAF Super Cup are as following :

Broadcast coverage
Below are the current broadcast rights holders of this competition:

See also
Super Cup
CAF Champions League
CAF Confederation Cup

References

External links
CAF Super Cup at CAFonline.com
RSSSF
CAF Super Cup summary - Soccerway

 
Super Cup